Ali Mumtaz al-Daftary, an Iraqi nationalist-oriented politician, held several posts in the monarchy, including parliamentary and ministerial positions.

He belongs to the al-Daftary family, a well-known family, including Mahmoud Sobhi al-Daftary, Sabih Mumtaz al-Daftary, and Naim Mumtaz al-Daftary, and was married to Ms. Nemat bint Yassin al-Hashemi.

He worked at the Ministry of Finance early in the founding of the Kingdom of Iraq.

He was part of Taha al-Hashemi's ministry in 1941. He served as finance minister the same year in the third ministry of Nuri al-Said.

After that, he served as Minister of Foreign Affairs in the Second Ministry of Tawfiq al Souwaidy from May 21, 1946 to May 30, 1946. 

Then in 1946, he was part of the fourth cabinet of Nuri al-Said, where he served as Minister of works and transportation and a representative of the Liberal Party, but later resigned.

He was an opponent of Jabr and supported the 1948 demonstrations.

He was finance minister again in 1948.

After the resignation of Mohamed Fadhel al-Jamali's ministry in 1954, Nouri al-Said offered him to participate in his ministry, but he apologized, and Nuri al-Said later apologized for the formation of the government that entrusted Arshad al-Omari to form his second cabinet.

In 1957, he served as acting foreign minister in Ali Jawdat al Ayyubi's thirdministry.

Literature 

 Ali Mumtaz al-Daftary and his political role in Iraq (milestones in the politicsof Iraq in the monarchy) by Hamid Faraj Abdul Hussein. Published in 2018. A master thesis presented in 2014 to basic education at Mustansiriya University.

References 

Iraqi Turkmen people
Year of birth missing
Finance ministers of Iraq
Year of death missing